Kaarlo Juhana Yrjö-Koskinen (26 March 1930 Helsinki – 16 April 2007 Helsinki) was a Finnish baron, journalist and diplomat who worked in industrial organizations but did his real life work in Finland's foreign affairs and acted as Finland's ambassador in several countries.

Yrjö-Koskinen graduated as a lawyer in 1955. His first job at the Ministry for Foreign Affairs was the secretary of the Honorary Consul in Rouen, France. These tasks were often unpopular and focused on trade relations and seafaring problems. After serving as an official in several Finnish delegations, Yrjö-Koskinen participated in the establishment of the OECD Delegation in Finland in 1968.

He was Head of the United Nations Economic Commission for Europe (ECE) Trade and Technology Department from 1970 to 1974 and Deputy Head of Trade Policy Department of the Finnish Ministry of Foreign Affairs from 1974 to 1976. Yrjö-Koskinen was Finland's ambassador in Budapest from 1977 to 1979, in Vienna and at the Holy See from 1983 to 1988 and in Oslo from 1988 to 1993. He was also the President of the Finnish Foreign Trade Association 1979–1983.

References

Ambassadors of Finland to Austria
Ambassadors of Finland to the Holy See
Ambassadors of Finland to Norway
Ambassadors of Finland to Hungary
1930 births
2007 deaths
Permanent Representatives of Finland to the United Nations
20th-century Finnish journalists